René Torres (born 13 October 1960) is a Venezuelan footballer. He played in 19 matches for the Venezuela national football team from 1985 to 1989. He was also part of Venezuela's squad for the 1983 Copa América tournament.

References

External links
 

1960 births
Living people
Venezuelan footballers
Venezuela international footballers
Place of birth missing (living people)
Association football defenders
Deportivo Anzoátegui managers